The End of Protest is a book by Micah White, the co-creator of Occupy Wall Street and former editor of Adbusters magazine, published in 2016 by Knopf Canada. The End of Protest was a bestseller in Canada for five consecutive weeks according to BookManager.

References

More information 
Official book website

Canadian non-fiction books
Occupy Wall Street
2016 non-fiction books
Knopf Canada books